Davide Ferrario (born  26 June 1956) is an Italian film director, screenwriter and author.

Life and career 
Born in Casalmaggiore, Cremona, Ferrario graduated in Anglo-American literature, then he began to work in film distribution, and he contributed to import in Italy many indie films by John Sayles, Jim Jarmusch, Susan Seidelman, Godfrey Reggio. He also collaborated as a film critic with the cinema magazine Cineforum, and he wrote a monograph about Rainer Werner Fassbinder.

After collaborating to several screenplays, Ferrario made his directorial debut in 1987 with the short film Non date da mangiare agli animali, and in 1989 he directed his first feature film, the neo-noir The End of the Night.
His 2004 film After Midnight entered the Forum section at the 54th Berlin International Film Festival, in which Ferrario won the Caligari Film Prize and the Don Quixote Award. Also a novelist, his 1995 debut novel  Dissolvenza al nero was later adapted into a film, Fade to Black by Oliver Parker.

Selected filmography 
 The End of the Night (1989)
 Love Burns (1994)
 We All Fall Down (1997)
 Children of Hannibal (1998)
 Guardami (1999)
 After Midnight (2004)
 Blood on the Crown (2021)

References

External links 
 

1956 births
People from Casalmaggiore
Italian film directors
Italian television directors
Living people
Italian screenwriters
Italian male screenwriters